Clinton-Massie High School is a public high school near Clarksville, Ohio in the United States, the only high school in the Clinton-Massie local school district. It was named for the county and township it was first located in when it originated as a consolidated school and assumed responsibility for the enrollment of four former schools: Adams Township, North Kingman, Clarksville (all in Clinton County) and Harveysburg (in Warren County). As of 2016 the school's enrollment by gender was 299 boys and 268 girls. It holds a rating of excellent with distinction. The school's superintendent is Matt Baker.

Athletics 
Clinton-Massie's athletic program, known as the Falcons, was a charter member of the Fort Ancient Valley Conference (FAVC) from 1964 until 1977. From 1977 until 2001, the school was part of the Kenton Trace Conference (KTC). From 2002 until 2004, it was a member of the Southern Buckeye Athletic/Academic Conference (SBAAC). The school is left in 2005 to join the South Central Ohio League (SCOL), but rejoined the SBAAC in the 2017 following the disbanding of the SCOL.

Ohio High School Athletic Association State Championships 

 Football - 2012, 2013, 2021

Notable alumni 
 Chuck Cleaver, musician
 Cliff Rosenberger, Speaker of the Ohio House of Representatives from 2015 to 2018

References

External links 
 

High schools in Clinton County, Ohio
Public high schools in Ohio